Travis Jones (born October 15, 1999) is an American football nose tackle for the Baltimore Ravens of the National Football League (NFL). He played college football at UConn. Jones was drafted by the Ravens in the 3rd round, 76th overall in the 2022 NFL Draft.

Career
Jones attended Wilbur Cross High School in New Haven, Connecticut. He committed to the University of Connecticut to play college football.

Jones played at UConn from 2018 to 2021. He did not play in 2020, due to Connecticut canceling their season due to the COVID-19 pandemic. He finished his career with 134 tackles and 8.5 sacks.

Professional career

Jones was drafted by the Baltimore Ravens in the third round, 76th overall, of the 2022 NFL Draft.

References

External links
 Baltimore Ravens bio
UConn Huskies bio

Living people
Players of American football from New Haven, Connecticut
American football defensive ends
American football defensive tackles
UConn Huskies football players
Baltimore Ravens players
1999 births
Wilbur Cross High School alumni